Margaret Adetutu Adeoye (born 22 April 1985) is a British track and field athlete who competes in the 200 metres. She represented Great Britain at that distance at London 2012.

Her then personal best for the 200m was gained on 6 August 2012 when she ran the distance in 22.94s, giving her a place in the Olympic 200m Semi-Finals. She finished 7th in the Semi-Finals, and didn't progress into the finals.  In 2013, she managed to improve her personal best to 22.88.

International competitions

References

External links
 

1985 births
Living people
Sportspeople from Lagos
Athletes from London
Nigerian female sprinters
English female sprinters
British female sprinters
Olympic female sprinters
Olympic athletes of Great Britain
Athletes (track and field) at the 2012 Summer Olympics
Commonwealth Games bronze medallists for England
Commonwealth Games medallists in athletics
Athletes (track and field) at the 2014 Commonwealth Games
World Athletics Championships athletes for Great Britain
World Athletics Championships medalists
European Athletics Championships medalists
World Athletics Indoor Championships medalists
British Athletics Championships winners
English people of Nigerian descent
Medallists at the 2014 Commonwealth Games